Godefroy, a surname of Old French origin, and originally a given name, cognate with Geoffrey/Geoffroy/Jeffrey/Jeffries, Godfrey, Gottfried, etc.  Godefroy may refer to:

People

Given name
 Godefroi, Comte d'Estrades (1607–1686), French diplomat and marshal
 Godefroy de Blonay (1869–1937), a member of the International Olympic Committee and one of the founders and first president of the Swiss Olympic Association
 Godefroy Calès (1799–1868), French physician and politician
 Godefroy De Forçant (died 1809), French Navy officer and adventurer
 Godefroy Durand (1832–1896), German-born French illustrator and draughtsman
 Godefroy Engelmann (1788–1839), Franco-German lithographer and chromolithographer
 Godefroy Maurice de La Tour d'Auvergne, Duke of Bouillon (1636–1721)
 Godefroy de La Tour d'Auvergne (1728–1792), Duke of Bouillon
 Godefroy Vujicic (born 1975), French classical cellist
 Godefroy Wendelin (1580–1667), astronomer from the County of Loon (now in Belgium)
 Godefroy Zumoffen (1848–1928), French Jesuit archaeologist and geologist

Surname
 Andrew Godefroy (born 1972), Canadian strategic analyst and science and technology historian
 Charles Godefroy (1888–1958), French aviator noted for flying through the Arc de Triomphe in Paris in 1919
 Denis Godefroy (1549–1622), French jurist
 Eliza Anderson Godefroy (1779–1839), believed to be the first woman to edit a general-interest magazine in the United States, wife of Maximilian Godefroy
 Frédéric Godefroy (1826–1897), French author
 Hugh C. Godefroy, World War II flying ace with the Royal Air Force and Royal Canadian Air Force - see List of World War II flying aces
 Jean-Pierre Godefroy (born 1944), French politician
 Maximilian Godefroy (1765–c. 1838), French-American architect
 Thibault Godefroy (born 1985), French bobsledder
 Godefroy family, a French noble family

Other
 Raymond de Gaufredi (died 1310), sometimes anglicized as Raymond Godefroy, Minister General of the Franciscan Order from 1289 to 1295

Places
 La Godefroy, a commune in the Manche department of France
 Godefroy, Les Cayes, Haiti, a village in the Les Cayes municipality
 Godefroy River, Quebec, Canada

See also 
 Galfrid
 Geoffrey (given name), Geoffroy (surname), Jeffrey, Jeffries, Jeffers
 Godfrey (name), Gottfried, Goffredo
 Godred/Guðrøðr
 Gofraid/Goraidh

Surnames of French origin
Surnames from given names